Pedaeosaurus is an extinct genus of therocephalian therapsids. Fossils have been found from the Fremouw Formation in the southern Transantarctic Mountains of Antarctica. Pedaeosaurus has traditionally been classified as a scaloposaurid and more recently as an ericiolacertid closely related to Ericiolacerta (also from the Fremouw Formation).

References

Baurioids
Therocephalia genera
Early Triassic synapsids
Extinct animals of Antarctica
Triassic Antarctica
Fossil taxa described in 1979